NuBreed is a trio of Australian record producers Jason Catherine, Michael Walburgh, and Danny Bonnici (vocalist). They have performed several remixes for artists such as The Crystal Method, Luke Chable, and Way Out West.  They have also recorded several DJ mixes including Electric_02 for EQ Recordings and an entry in Distinct'ive Breaks Records' Y4k series.  Their singles are most often released on Zero Tolerance Recordings and Mob Records.

Discography

Studio albums

Awards

ARIA Music Awards
The ARIA Music Awards is an annual awards ceremony that recognises excellence, innovation, and achievement across all genres of Australian music. They commenced in 1987. NuBreed were nominated for one award.

|-
| 2004
| The Original
| ARIA Award for Best Dance Release
| 
|-

References

External links

Australian record producers